Dean Court is a suburb  west of the centre of Oxford, England. Dean Court was part of Berkshire until the 1974 local government boundary changes transferred it to Oxfordshire.

History
The area was the site of a medieval grange of Abingdon Abbey, excavated in the 1970s and 1980s.  Dean Court was first mentioned in the 14th century under the name of "La Dene".  The name reflects its location between Wytham Hill and Cumnor Hill:  the Old English denu is a word used for long narrow valleys with moderately steep gradients on either side.  In 1538 there was a reference to "the rectory of Dencourt".  However there is no later record of the church which was evidently in the hamlet during the Middle Ages.

A map of 1761 shows Dean Court as a small hamlet on the road from Oxford to Eynsham, and so it remained until after the Second World War.

Development of the area started in the early 1950s with a housing estate called Pinnocks Way. In 1969 Deanfield Road, Broad Close and Owlington Close were built north of Eynsham Road by Wimpey Homes. The Orchard Road estate (originally marketed as "The Hawthornes") was built by 
Broseley Estates Limited and Costain in 1983 and later in 1985 houses were added by Thameway and Macleans. The Fogwell Road estate was built in 1986.

There is now the church of Saint Andrew, Dean Court that was built as a chapel of ease.

References

Areas of Oxford
Housing estates in Oxfordshire